Franceska Rapkin (15 May 1936 – 13 December 2001) was a British thematic philatelist who was appointed to the Roll of Distinguished Philatelists in 1998. She was the first chairperson of the British Thematic Association.

She was a refugee with her parents from Nazi Germany.

She was the first British philatelist to win a gold medal for a thematic exhibit which she did with her entry, "1936 Olympic Games" at ISRAPHIL ’85. In 1988, she received a second Gold model at OLYMPHILEX ’88. In 1989 she won the Congress Medal of the Association of British Philatelic Societies.

She is a member of the American Philatelic Society Hall of Fame.

Selected publications
 Guidelines for Thematic Judges and Exhibitors at Local and Federation Level (c.1989)
 Guidelines for Successful Exhibiting (1991)

See also
 Leon Vincent Rapkin

References

British philatelists
Signatories to the Roll of Distinguished Philatelists
1936 births
2001 deaths
Women philatelists
German emigrants to the United Kingdom
Fellows of the Royal Philatelic Society London
Place of birth missing
Place of death missing